Francis Vreeland (1879 - September 4, 1954) was an American painter.

Life
Vreeland was born in 1879 in Seward, Nebraska. He was educated in Paris and Cincinnati.

Vreeland became a painter in Los Angeles in the 1920s. His studio was located in Los Feliz. He was a member of the National Society of Mural Painters, and the president of the California Art Club.

Vreeland died on September 4, 1954 in Los Angeles. His work can be seen at the Museum of Nebraska Art. He is the namesake of the Francis William Vreeland Scholarship Award at the University of Nebraska–Lincoln.

References

1879 births
1954 deaths
People from Seward, Nebraska
Painters from Nebraska
Artists from Los Angeles
American male painters
American muralists
20th-century American painters
20th-century American male artists